Kozma Cove (Zaliv Kozma \'za-liv koz-'ma\) is a 1.8 km wide cove indenting for 1.2 km the north coast of Desolation Island between the two arms of that V-shaped island situated in the entrance to Hero Bay, Livingston Island, Antarctica.  The area was frequented by early nineteenth century English and American sealers operating from nearby Blythe Bay.  British mapping in 1968, Spanish in 1991 and Bulgarian in 2005 and 2009.  Named after the Bulgarian scholar Presbyter Cosmas (10th century AD).

Maps
 L.L. Ivanov et al. Antarctica: Livingston Island and Greenwich Island, South Shetland Islands. Scale 1:100000 topographic map. Sofia: Antarctic Place-names Commission of Bulgaria, 2005.
 L.L. Ivanov. Antarctica: Livingston Island and Greenwich, Robert, Snow and Smith Islands. Scale 1:120000 topographic map.  Troyan: Manfred Wörner Foundation, 2009.

References
 Kozma Cove. SCAR Composite Gazetteer of Antarctica.
 Bulgarian Antarctic Gazetteer. Antarctic Place-names Commission. (details in Bulgarian, basic data in English)

External links
 Kozma Cove. Copernix satellite image

Coves of Greenwich Island
Bulgaria and the Antarctic